Deshamanya L. D. Cyril Herath was a Sri Lankan Inspector-General of Police and Permanent Secretary to the Ministry of Defence.

Education
He was educated at St. John's College, Nugegoda and at the Royal College, Colombo and graduated from the University of Ceylon, Peradeniya with a BA in Economics, History and Philosophy, where he gained university colours in Athletics.

Police career
Thereafter he joined the  Ceylon Police Force as a probationary Assistant Superintendent of Police in 1957 and was promoted to Superintendent of Police (SP) in 1969. Herath was serving as SP Anuradhapura, when he was appointed Director of the Intelligence Services Division (ISD). The Police ISD was tasked with revamping intelligence gathering and internal security work following the 1971 JVP Insurrection. He established ISD headquarters at No.10 Cambridge Place and developed an effective staff and intelligence network. He was promoted to Deputy Inspector General of Police (DIG) in 1975. He served as the Inspector-General of Police from December 1985 to August 1988.

Later work
Following his retirement from the police, he served as Chairman of the National Savings Bank from September 1994 to March 2002 before taking up appointment as Permanent Secretary of the Ministry of Defence from 2003 to 2004. In 2005, he was awarded the title Deshamanya by the President of Sri Lanka.

Family

His son Arjuna is a partner of Ernst & Young (Sri Lanka).

See also
 List of Sri Lankan non-career Permanent Secretaries

References

2011 deaths
Sri Lankan Inspectors General of Police
Sri Lankan intelligence operatives
Sri Lankan bankers
Alumni of St. John's College, Nugegoda
Alumni of Royal College, Colombo
Alumni of the University of Ceylon (Peradeniya)
Year of birth missing
Permanent secretaries of Sri Lanka
Deshamanya